The battle of Thessalonica took place in the fall of 1040 near the city of Thessalonica  in contemporary Greece between the Bulgarians and the Byzantines. The battle ended with a Byzantine victory.

Origins of the conflict 

The news of the successes of the uprising of Peter Delyan, which broke out in the beginning of 1040 in Belgrade, soon reached Armenia, where many Bulgarian nobles were resettled after the fall of the First Bulgarian Empire in 1018. The most influential of these was Alusian, the second son of the last Bulgarian Emperor Ivan Vladislav (1015–1018). Dressed as a mercenary soldier he went to Constantinople from where he got to Bulgaria despite the strict control.

The battle 

His arrival would mean more tensions in the rebel camp because Alusian could also claim the throne and he kept his origin in secret until he found supporters. Peter II Delyan welcomed his cousin although he knew that Alusian might be a potential candidate for his crown. Peter II gave Alusian a 40,0000-strong army to attack Thessalonica, the second largest city in the Byzantine Empire.

Alusian proved to be an incapable general: when he reached the city he attacked the Byzantine army with his tired troops. The Bulgarians could not fight effectively and were defeated. They suffered heavy casualties - 15,000 perished in the battle. Alusian fled from the battlefield, leaving his army behind.

Aftermath 

The catastrophe at Thessalonica worsened the relations between Peter Delyan and Alusian. The latter was ashamed from the defeat and Delyan suspected treason. Alusian decided to act first and after a feast in the beginning of 1041 he blinded the Emperor. After that Alusian tried to continue the rebellion, but defeated once more, he decided to change sides and abandoned his army again, an act that was richly rewarded in Constantinople.

Although blind, Peter Delyan faced the Byzantines with the rest of the Bulgarian army but was defeated in the battle of Ostrovo later that year and the uprising was crushed.

References 
Йордан Андреев, Милчо Лалков, Българските ханове и царе, Велико Търново, 1996.

1040s in the Byzantine Empire
11th century in Bulgaria
Battles involving the First Bulgarian Empire
Battles of the Byzantine–Bulgarian Wars in Thessalonica
Conflicts in 1040
1040 in Europe
Military history of Thessaloniki
Uprising of Peter Delyan